Pedro Cosio Masden was a Uruguayan politician and diplomat.
In 1910 as Candidate of the Colorado Party (Uruguay) he was elected 24th legislative period as representative of the Department of Montevideo in the Chamber of Representatives of Uruguay from 15 February 1911 to 27 March 1913.
From 1913 to 1916 he was Minister of Public Works.
In 1916 he was Minister plenipotentiary in Madrid.
From 1917 to June, 1918 and from 1932 to 1933 he was Minister plenipotentiary in London.
From June, 1918 to February, 1919 he was Minister plenipotentiary in Washington, D.C.
From 1927 to 1932 he was Minister plenipotentiary in Berlin.
From 1933 to 1934 he was Minister of Finance of Uruguay.

Biography 
He entered a career at the Customs service.
He became Assistant in the Custom House Service, Inspector of Frontiers, and Sub-Treasurer General, commissioned especially by the Government to make studies on inland and river Custom Houses. 
From March, 1919 to 1923 he was elected National Counsellor in the Senate of Uruguay.
In 1915 he presided over the Uruguayan delegation sent to the First Financial Conference at Washington.
In April, 1916 he led the Uruguayan Commission to the first Commission meeting in Buenos Aires of the first Pan American Financial Conference in 1915 called to study the question of uniform legislation.

Publications 
 Two volumes of official reports dealing with Custom House questions; 
 Tarifas de aduana y tratados de comercio, a pamphlet; 
 Post-War Organisation of Labour in the United Kingdom, a pamphlet in English; * La conversion y los problemas del credito, a pamphlet.
 Regimen bancario ; Ensayos Politicos, 1897.
 El doctor Rene, a novel, 1903.
 Accidentes del trabajo, 1908.
 La proteccion industrial y la Jornada de ocho horas, 1908.
 Tarifas de aduana, 1910.
 La ensenanza profesional, 1910.
 El poder ejecutivo colegiado, 1915.

References

Ministers of Economics and Finance of Uruguay
Ambassadors of Uruguay to the United Kingdom
Ambassadors of Uruguay to Germany
1873 births
1943 deaths
Colorado Party (Uruguay) politicians